Saint Potamon of Heraclea (or Potamon of Alexandria, Potamone, Potamion; died ) was a bishop of Heraclea in Egypt who was persecuted under the emperor Maximinus Daza, attended the First Council of Nicaea, then was martyred in Egypt by the Arians.
His feast day is 18 May.

Roman Martyrology

The Roman Martyrology of 1914 has an entry under May 18;

Monks of Ramsgate account

The monks of St Augustine's Abbey, Ramsgate wrote in their Book of Saints (1921),

Butler's account

The hagiographer Alban Butler (1710–1773) wrote in his Lives of the Fathers, Martyrs, and Other Principal Saints under May 18,

Notes

Sources

 

Saints from Roman Egypt
341 deaths